Osmania University is a collegiate public state university located in  Hyderabad, Telangana, India. Mir Osman Ali Khan, the 7th Nizam of Hyderabad in 1918 , He released a farman to establish OSMANIA UNIVERSITY on the day of 29 August 1917. It is the third oldest university in southern India, and the first to be established in the erstwhile Kingdom of Hyderabad. It was the first Indian university to have Urdu as a medium of instruction — but with English as a compulsory subject. As of 2012, the university hosts 3,700 international students from more than 80 nations.

The O.U. is one of the largest university systems in the world with over 300,000 students on its campuses and affiliated colleges. The Osmania Medical College was once a part of the O.U. System. However, it is now under the supervision of Kaloji Narayana Rao University of Health Sciences.

History 

The Osmania University was brought into existence in 1918 through a firman of Mir Osman Ali Khan, the last Nizam of Hyderabad. The need for a university in Hyderabad State was felt for a long time, and in 1917, Sir Akbar Hydari, in a memorandum to the Education Minister, emphasised the need to establish a university with Urdu as the medium of instruction "as it is the language of the widest currency in India".

After independence and the accession of Hyderabad State in 1948, the university fell under the purview of the state government. English replaced Urdu as the medium of instruction, and the Nizam's crown was also removed from the university seal.

In 2022 the National Institutional Ranking Framework (NIRF) ranked Osmania University 22nd in universities.

Seal 
The original seal featured the Nizam's crown as the crest, along with the phrase Noorun Ala Noor. It also contained the hadith, "I am the city of knowledge and Ali is its gate".

The present emblem contains inscriptions in Telugu and Sanskrit. The new logo has the Urdu letter Ain in between.

Campus

The Main campus is a chief intellectual centre in Hyderabad, and its alumni and faculty members include many distinguished individuals, including former Prime Minister of India P. V. Narasimha Rao. Admission to Main campus departments of Genetics, Biochemistry, Biotechnology, Chemistry, Engineering, Management, and Law is highly competitive. The state government has appointed Prof S.Ramachandram as vice chancellor of the university. The university is accredited by the NAAC with an 'A+' Grade and conferred with the status of 'University with Potential for Excellence' by the UGC, New Delhi.

The University Colleges are located in begumpet university. There are ten such colleges: the University College of Arts and Social Sciences, University College of Commerce & Business Management, University College of Technology, University College of Engineering, University College of Law, University College of Science, Institute of Advance Study in Education, and PG College of Physical Education. The university offers courses in Humanities, Arts, Sciences, Social Sciences, Law, Engineering, Medicine, Technology, Commerce and Business Management, Information Technology and Oriental Languages. In 2001, Osmania was awarded five-star status by the National Accreditation and Assessment Council (NAAC) of the University Grants Commission, part of the Government of India.

The university has a campus of nearly 1600 acres (6 km2) with 300,000 students (counting all the campuses, constituent affiliated colleges and district centres) making it one of the largest higher education systems in India.  Nearly 5000 faculty and staff are employed at Osmania. It attracts students from across the nation as well as from other countries.

Organisation and administration

Constituent colleges
Osmania University is a confederation of university colleges, constituent colleges, and affiliated colleges. The constituent colleges of the university include:
Nizam College
Post Graduate College of Law, Basheerbhagh
University College for Women, Koti
University College of Science, Saifabad
University Post Graduate College, Secunderabad

Other Autonomous Centers
Institution of Electronics and Telecommunication Engineers, Hyderabad
Indian Council of Social Science Research, Hyderabad
Center For Plant Molecular Biology
Center For Indian Ocean Studies
Japal-Rangapur Observatory
Research and Training Unit in Navigational Electronics
Regional Center For Urban and Environmental Studies
National Institute of Nutrition
City College Hyderabad
Center For Stem Cell Science, Hyderabad
Anwar Ul Uloom College, Hyderabad
PGRR center for distance education

Affiliated engineering colleges
The affiliated engineering colleges of the university are mostly scattered throughout the GHMC area and offer various undergraduate and post-graduate engineering courses.
The affiliated engineering colleges include (in no particular order):
 Chaitanya Bharathi Institute of Technology
 Muffakham Jah College of Engineering and Technology
 Deccan College of Engineering and Technology
 Maturi Venkata Subba Rao Engineering College 
 Methodist College of Engineering and Technology
 Stanley College of Engineering and Technology for Women
 Vasavi College of Engineering
 Islamia Engineering College

Academics

Admissions
Osmania is a non-profit university which is funded and managed by the government. Admissions into the Bachelor of Engineering, Masters and Doctoral programs in main campus is on a merit basis, evaluated by national entrance examinations (EAMCET, GATE, BCFSBTGMES-N&D, TSLAWCET, O.U. PhD Entrance Exam, DOST etc.) for each of the courses offered.

Library

The University Library is the main library of the university and it was founded in 1918 along with the university. It has close to 500,000 books and more than 6000 manuscripts, which includes rare palm leave manuscripts. It also has various journals, government documents, etc. The main library coordinates a library system, which connects the libraries in the entire campus and other constituent college libraries.

Rankings 

Osmania University has ranked 1001–1200 in the world by the QS World University Rankings of 2022,  301–350 among universities in Asia category by the QS Asia Ranking 2020 and ranked on 32 in QS India Ranking in 2020.
The Times Higher Education World University Rankings ranked it 801–1000 globally in the 2020 ranking 251–300 in Asia in 2021 and 251–300 among Emerging Economies University Rankings 2021.
The National Institutional Ranking Framework (NIRF) ranked it 29 among universities in 2020.

Research 
The research activities are funded by various autonomous agencies of the government of India. Foreign students are also admitted to the university via UFRO (University Foreign Relations Office) that allots admissions with minimum criteria. Indian students living overseas Non-resident Indian are also admitted through UFRO that are usually ineligible to get admissions via the entrance exams quota.

Notable alumni and faculty

Notable alumni of Osmania University include 9th Prime Minister of India P. V. Narasimha Rao, Jaipal Reddy, cabinet minister, 16th and last Chief Minister of united Andhra Pradesh with Telangana Nallari Kiran Kumar Reddy, CEO Adobe systems Shantanu Narayen and senior advocate Subodh Markandeya.

Other alumni include spiritual guide and founder of Shrimad Rajchandra Mission Dharampur, Pujya Gurudevshri Rakeshji, pro chancellor of khaja bandanawaz university Syed Muhammad Ali Al Hussaini, former Indian Cricket team captain Mohammed Azharuddin, cricket commentator Harsha Bhogle, novelist Venkatesh Kulkarni, author and poet Sneha Narayanan, PDSU founder George Reddy, former Union Home Minister Shivraj Patil, former governor of the Reserve Bank of India Yaga Venugopal Reddy, chemist Garikapati Narahari Sastry, Metallurgist and former Vice Chancellor of Banaras Hindu University Patcha Ramachandra Rao and physicist Raziuddin Siddiqui. Rakesh Sharma, cosmonaut and the first Indian to travel in space, was a graduate of Osmania. Karan Bilimoria, founder of Cobra Beer, Member of the House of Lords, and the seventh Chancellor of the University of Birmingham earned his Bachelor of Commerce degree from Osmania in 1981. Rafi Ahmed, a well-known virologist and immunologist graduated from Osmania University in 1968.

Notable former faculty members of the university include Bhadriraju Krishnamurti, Dravidianist and linguist, and founder of linguistics department at the university, physicist Suri Bhagavantam, and linguist Masud Husain Khan..

References

External links 

 
Colleges under Osmania University

 
Heritage structures in Hyderabad, India
Education in the princely states of India
Establishments in Hyderabad State
1918 establishments in India
Educational institutions established in 1918
State universities in Telangana